Jimmy Reece (November 17, 1929 – September 28, 1958) was an American racecar driver.  He died in an accident during a 1958 Champ Car race at Trenton Speedway.

Indianapolis 500 results

World Championship career summary
The Indianapolis 500 was part of the FIA World Championship from 1950 through 1960. Drivers competing at Indy during those years were credited with World Championship points and participation. Jimmy Reece participated in 6 World Championship races but scored no World Championship points.

1954 Bobby Ball Memorial race
On November 8, 1954, Reece crashed during the Bobby Ball Memorial, an AAA Champ Car event held at the Arizona State Fairgrounds, sustaining "a punctured lung, fractured right shoulder and possible internal injuries when his car flipped coming out of the south turn [...] and crashed into the east wall."

AAA Championship Trail
Reece and Bill Vukovich tied for 4th in the 1954 AAA championship standings.  Reece scored 1000 points in 6 races by finishing 2nd, 3rd or 5th; Vukovich scored 1000 points for winning the Indianapolis 500.

Death
On September 28, 1958, Reece was killed during a USAC Champ Car race held at Trenton Speedway.  On the first turn of the last lap, Reece's inside wheels got into the dirt next to the concrete track, causing his car to change its direction and run up an embankment.  After bursting through a two-foot wooden fence on the edge of the track, the Kurtis 500G spiraled through the air and smashed down on a hurricane fence, having ejected Reece, who died of multiple injuries in an ambulance.

References

External links

1929 births
1958 deaths
American people of Welsh descent
Sportspeople from Oklahoma City
Racing drivers from Oklahoma
Racing drivers from Oklahoma City
Indianapolis 500 drivers
AAA Championship Car drivers
Racing drivers who died while racing
Sports deaths in New Jersey